Danger Street is a 1947 American mystery film directed by Lew Landers and written by Winston Miller, Kae Salkow and Maxwell Shane. The film stars Jane Withers, Robert Lowery, Bill Edwards, Elaine Riley, Audrey Young and Lyle Talbot. It was released on June 20, 1947 by Paramount Pictures.

Plot

Cast 
Jane Withers as Pat Marvin
Robert Lowery as Larry Burke
Bill Edwards as Sandy Evans
Elaine Riley as Cynthia Van Loan
Audrey Young as Dolores Johnson
Lyle Talbot as Charles Johnson
Charles Quigley as Carl Pauling
Lucia Carroll as Smitty
Nina Mae McKinney as Veronica
Vera Marshe as Amanda Matthews
Roy Gordon as John Matthews
Paul Harvey as Turlock

References

External links 
 

1947 films
Paramount Pictures films
American mystery films
1947 mystery films
Films directed by Lew Landers
American black-and-white films
1940s English-language films
1940s American films